(born 10 March 1941) is a former rugby union player and coach. He played as a prop.

Career
After attending Shijonaga High School, Miyaji headed to Doshisha University. In his university enrollment days,  he joined at the second Japanese Association invited NHK Cup along with Yoshihiro Sakata and other players, winning against Kintetsu and virtually took part in rugby. Later, he got a work in Sanyo Tokyo. Also, he took part in the Japan national rugby union team, with which he participated in the Asian championship in 1969, during the match against Hong Kong and won 1 cap.
After his retirement, he became the coach of Japan twice in 1978 and 1984. And after the resignation of his predecessor Hitoshi Oka, he took the lead for the third time as head coach for the Japan national team in the 1987 Rugby World Cup, taking the command during the tournament. Then, he took over as coach for Sanyo. Every year in the same period, he fought a nomination against Kobe Steel, which won most in Japan at that time. Currently he runs a landscaping business, as well, he works on the development of Panasonic Wild Knights' training ground.
Nobuhiro Baba, the original author of the TV dorama School☆Wars is a junior student in Shijonaga High School and has been providing a large number of rugby-related materials for writing his work.

Anecdotes
At the final of the National Rugby Football Tournament on 8 January 1991, immediately after Sanyo Electric's unexpected loss against Kobe Steel, it is said that inside of his mind went blank.
In the final match of the 45th Japan Rugby Football Championship tournament held in March 2008, after the defeat of Suntory Sungoliath, he visited Chichibunomiya Rugby Stadium in a sunny day. After the match, Miyaji cried, saying "Honma, it was longer". Furthermore, he was sought from Sanyo Fifteen and he was lifted up.

Notes

External links

1941 births
Living people
Rugby union props
Sportspeople from Osaka Prefecture
Japanese rugby union players
Japan international rugby union players
Japan national rugby team coaches
Rugby union coaches
Saitama Wild Knights players